En småstad vid seklets början ("A Small Town at the Beginning of the Century") was the Sveriges Television's Christmas calendar and Sveriges Radio's Christmas Calendar in 1966. The radio version was called En jul för 50 år sedan (A Christmas 50 Years Ago).

Plot
The story is set during the 1910s in a port town in central Sweden.

References

External links
The TV show at SVT's open archive
 

1966 radio programme debuts
1966 radio programme endings
1966 Swedish television series debuts
1966 Swedish television series endings
Sveriges Radio's Christmas Calendar
Sveriges Television's Christmas calendar
Television shows set in Sweden
Television series set in the 1910s
Nautical television series